D-Noy Muzik is a label founded by Daniel Desnoyers in June 1999 within the Donald K. Donald Group. In 2003, DKD D-Noy Muzik became D-Noy Muzik, for which Dan Desnoyers is the sole owner. D-Noy releases all of his music on this label.

Releases

Artists
List of artists signed to D-Noy Muzik.

Ben DJ
Benji de la House
Ben Simons
CJ Stone
Daniel Desnoyers
Danni Rouge
Danny Dove
DJ M.E.G. and Timati
DJs from Mars
Felix Cartal
Global Deejays
Javi Mula
Jean Elan
Joachim Garraud
Klaas
Kurd Maverick
Lady Alexandra T.
Made in June
Mathieu Bouthier
Menini & Viani
Mischa Daniels
Molella
Nari & Milani
Neils Van Gogh
Peakafeller
Ricky Monaco
Serebro
Sophie Ellis Bextor
Spankox
Spankers
Sunny Marleen
The Cube Guys
Tony Star

References

Canadian independent record labels
Companies based in Montreal
Record label distributors
Record labels established in 1999
1999 establishments in Canada